Horst Rascher (born 11 March 1940) is a German boxer. He competed at the 1960 Summer Olympics and the 1968 Summer Olympics.

References

External links
 

1940 births
Living people
German male boxers
Olympic boxers of the United Team of Germany
Olympic boxers of West Germany
Boxers at the 1960 Summer Olympics
Boxers at the 1968 Summer Olympics
Sportspeople from Vienna
Bantamweight boxers